The following lists events that happened in 2014 in Iceland.

Incumbents
President – Ólafur Ragnar Grímsson 
Prime Minister – Sigmundur Davíð Gunnlaugsson

Events

April
 April 11 - Iceland supports sanctions against at Russian individuals, including freezing assets and travel bans.

May
 May 31 - Municipal elections took place.

August
 August 23 - Iceland issues an aviation alert for the Bárðarbunga volcano, which was expected to release significant amounts of ash.

References

 
2010s in Iceland
Iceland
Iceland
Years of the 21st century in Iceland